The 1962–63 British Ice Hockey season saw a return for the Scottish League but there was still no league structure in England for the third consecutive year. Durham Wasps competed in the Scottish League.

University Match
Cambridge University defeated Oxford University 6-4 at the Richmond Ice Rink.

Scottish League

Regular season
Eight teams participated in the league, it utilized an inter-linked schedule, as three of the eight teams did not have a home rink. Ayr Rangers were declared Champions.

Group A

Group B

Note: These standings are the last known ones for the year, dated February 8, 1963.

References 

British
1962 in English sport
1963 in English sport
1962 in Scottish sport
1963 in Scottish sport